The 1981 Richmond Spiders football team represented Richmond College during the 1981 NCAA Division I-A football season. The Spiders were led by second-year head coach Dal Shealy and played their home games at City Stadium. The Spiders finished with a 4–7 record.

Schedule

References

Richmond
Richmond Spiders football seasons
Richmond Spiders football